Vinzenz Hörtnagl (born 9 June 1948) is an Austrian weightlifter. He competed at the 1976 Summer Olympics and the 1980 Summer Olympics.

References

1948 births
Living people
Austrian male weightlifters
Olympic weightlifters of Austria
Weightlifters at the 1976 Summer Olympics
Weightlifters at the 1980 Summer Olympics
People from Innsbruck-Land District
Sportspeople from Tyrol (state)
20th-century Austrian people
21st-century Austrian people